Dorcadion peloponesium is a species of beetle in the family Cerambycidae. It was described by Pic in 1902. It is known from Greece.

References

peloponesium
Beetles described in 1902